Griffin De Vroe (born 2 November 1984) is a Belgian football goalkeeper who plays for Hamme.

References

1984 births
Living people
Belgian footballers
K.S.C. Lokeren Oost-Vlaanderen players
K.R.C. Mechelen players
Association football goalkeepers
Place of birth missing (living people)